Fathabad (also Romanized as Fatḩābād) is a village in Jangal Rural District, in the Central District of Fasa County, Fars Province, Iran. At the 2006 census, its population was 55, in 13 families.

References 

Populated places in Fasa County